Wildlife Act 1953 is an Act of Parliament in New Zealand. Under the act, the majority of native New Zealand vertebrate species are protected by law, and may not be hunted, killed, eaten or possessed. Violations may be punished with fines of up to $100,000.

Wildlife are classified under a number of schedules; all vertebrate species not included in these lists are protected by default. The schedules are occasionally amended; for example the kea was granted full protection in 1984, whereas the spur-winged plover (masked lapwing), an Australian species which naturally established itself in New Zealand in the 1930s, had its protected status removed in 2012.

The Act also provides for wildlife sanctuaries, refuges and management reserves.

Schedules

Schedule 1 – Wildlife declared to be game
This group comprises commonly hunted waterfowl (mallard, grey duck, Australasian shoveler, paradise shelduck, black swan and pūkeko) and introduced game birds, including pheasant, quail, chukar and partridge. These birds may be hunted during the open season, which begins in early May and lasts approximately four weeks.

Schedule 2 – Partially protected wildlife
This group comprises just the little owl, the silvereye and, on the Chatham Islands only, the brown skua (Catharacta antarctica lonnbergi). These birds may be shot by landowners if they pose a threat to crops or livestock, without any need for a permit from the Department of Conversation. This group formerly included the kea, which has been blamed for attacking sheep, but is now considered endangered.

Schedule 3 – Wildlife that may be hunted or killed subject to Minister's notification
These may be culled on application to the Department of Conservation, subject to whatever restrictions are imposed. This group includes the Australasian harrier, grey teal, grey-faced petrel, mute swan, black shag, little shag, pied shag and sooty shearwater.

Schedule 4 – Wildlife not protected, except in areas and during periods specified in Minister's notification
This group formerly consisted of feral horses, which had some degree of protection in the Kaimanawa range, but is now obsolete.

Schedule 5 – Wildlife not protected
This is a large group that includes many common domestic and introduced species, many of which are regarded as pests. It includes numerous land mammals and birds, three species of Australian Litoria tree frogs, the Australian rainbow skink (Lampropholis delicata) and the North American red-eared slider turtle (Trachemys scripta elegans). The only species on this list that occur naturally in New Zealand are the southern black-backed gull and the spur-winged plover (masked lapwing), both of which present a significant risk of bird strike.

Schedule 6 – Animals declared to be wild animals subject to the Wild Animal Control Act 1977
This group consists of the chamois, the Himalayan tahr, and all species of deer (the family Cervidae), goats (the genus Capra), and pigs (the genus Sus). All are considered harmful to New Zealand's native forests and may be hunted without restriction.

Schedule 7 – Terrestrial and freshwater invertebrates declared to be animals
Under the original legislation, the word "animal" referred only to land-based vertebrates. Schedule 7 was added to give protected status to a number of native invertebrates, most of them endangered. The species include two native grasshoppers, many species of beetle, including the Cromwell chafer and the coxella weevil, all giant wētā, the katipō spider, the Nelson cave spider, and several kinds of native snails including all Powelliphanta and Placostylus.

Schedule 7A – Marine species declared to be animals
Similarly, this list gives protected status to a number of marine species, including some corals (notably black coral), several sharks, and two species of grouper.

See also
Conservation in New Zealand

References

External links
Text of the Wildlife Act 1953

Statutes of New Zealand
1953 in New Zealand
1953 in law
Nature conservation in New Zealand
Wildlife law